TRE or Tre may refer to:

Art, entertainment, and media

Fictional characters
Tre Styles, in the movie Boyz n the Hood

Films
Tre (film), a 1996 Italian film by Christian De Sica
TRE (film), a 2008 American film by Eric Byler

Literature
Theologische Realenzyklopädie, a German encyclopedia of theology

Music
3 (Tre), a 2003 album by Alex Britti
¡Tré!, a 2012 album by Green Day
Tre, a 1983 album by Teresa De Sio

Television
Rai Tre, an Italian television channel

People 

 Tŕe Cool, the drummer of the American rock band Green Day

Biology and medicine
Tetracycline response element in tetracycline-controlled transcriptional activation
Tre recombinase, an HIV treatment
Time Restricted Eating, a type of Intermittent fasting

Places
Tre- (place name element), common in Cornwall
Tré, Benin, Collines, Benin
Tre Volost (fl. 1265–1471), a division of the Novgorod Republic
Tampere (abbreviated TRE), a city in Pirkanmaa, Finland

Transportation
Tiree Airport, IATA airport code TRE
Trenton Transit Center, Amtrak station code TRE
Trinity Railway Express, Dallas Fort Worth Metroplex, US
Nikola Tre, a proposed electric semi-truck tractor unit

Other uses
Tre (given name)
Telecommunications Research Establishment, UK
TRE (computing), a regular expression engine
Tre (instrument), a Cambodian trumpet
Tempore Regis Eduardi (in the time of Edward the Confessor), in the Domesday Book
Texas Reliability Entity, an electricity regulator
Tribunal Regional Eleitoral, an appellate court in Brazil

See also

Trey (disambiguation)
Three (disambiguation)